Columbus Unified High School is a high school in Columbus, Kansas.

References

Public high schools in Kansas
Education in Cherokee County, Kansas